Abercrombie Mountain is a tall peak in the Selkirk Mountains of northeast Washington located within the Colville National Forest. At  in elevation, it is the highest point in Stevens County, and the second highest peak in eastern Washington. Gypsy Peak, within the Salmo-Priest Wilderness is at least  taller.

Abercrombie Peak was named for Lieutenant William R. Abercrombie, who explored the nearby Pend Oreille River in 1879 and 1883.


See also

List of mountain peaks of North America
List of mountain peaks of the United States
List of Ultras of the United States

References

External links

 

Mountains of Washington (state)
Mountains of Stevens County, Washington
Selkirk Mountains